SUP (Russian: СУП, which means 'soup') is an international online media company, founded in Moscow in mid-2006 by Andrew Paulson and Alexander Mamut.  Its ownership is split between Mamut, Kommersant Publishing House and management.

SUP's first major announcement was a licensing agreement with Six Apart that gave SUP rights to use the LiveJournal brand, as well as operate portions of the LiveJournal service for LiveJournal's Russian users. SUP subsequently purchased LiveJournal outright from its previous owners, Six Apart.  Since its launch SUP has grown through acquisition and organically.  In June 2008 Kommersant, a leading Russian media company, acquired a significant minority stake in the business.

SUP is split into two business divisions, one is SUP Media, which includes Gazeta.ru (a popular online news site); Championat.com (an online sports site); and LiveJournal.com (a widely used blogging platform).  The other business line is SUP Advertising, which includes +SOL (an online sales house which sells SUP's inventory, Russian media sites and foreign media sites including Yahoo, the BBC, Last.fm and a number of newspaper sites) and Victory SA, a digital marketing agency.

In 2013, SUP was merged with Rambler.

References

External links
SUP corporate
SUP 
SUP media
LiveJournal.com
Championat.com
Gazeta.ru
Quto.ru
Redigo.ru

SUP advertising
+SOL 
Victory

Mass media companies established in 2006
Companies based in Moscow
Livejournal
Mass media companies of Russia
Internet in Russia